Vallibona is a small town and municipality located in the Ports comarca, province of Castelló, part of the autonomous community of Valencia, Spain. According to the 2009 census, it has a total population of 90 inhabitants. It is located in the upper valley of the Cérvol River, between the Serra del Turmell and the Ports de Beseit mountain ranges, in a very lonely area, relatively far from other towns. Vallibona is part of the Taula del Sénia free association of municipalities.

Vallibona has a special relationship with the town of Pena-roja (Peñarroya de Tastavins) over the hills in Matarranya. It has been recorded that festivities have been celebrated together with that town at least since the 14th century.

Sant Domènec de Vallibona is a small settlement with a church founded in 1237 located 12 km to the east, close to the road leading to Rossell.

Vallibona is the birthplace of La Pastora, nickname of Florencio Pla Meseguer, also known as Teresa (1917 - 2004), a transvestite Spanish Maquis who used to disguise as a female and who operated in the Maestrat area until the early 1960s.

This municipality should not be confused with Vallivana, a small settlement depending from Morella further SW.

History
Vallibona was a Muslim town until nearby Morella was conquered by James I of Aragon in the 13th century.

The town has lost much population in the last 100 years; it had 1,808 inhabitants in 1900 and 1,133 in 1950. After General Franco's Plan de Estabilización in 1959 the population declined steeply as people emigrated towards the industrial areas of Barcelona and coastal Castelló Province. Other causes of the strong emigration have been the abandonment of traditional agricultural practices by the local youth, such as sheep and goat rearing, as well as the lifestyle changes that swept over rural Spain during the second half of the 20th century.

By 1994 Vallibona had only a residual population of 104 inhabitants, mostly in their old age. Nowadays the town derives some income from rural tourism. Vallibona revives during the summer season when many former residents return to the town to spend the holidays.

See also
Pena-roja

Bibliography
Teofil Pitarch i Vives, Fraternitas Saecularis: Vallibona/Pena-roja de Tastavins, Diputació de Castelló. 2005,

References

External links 

 Associació cultural Amics de Vallibona.
 Associació cultural Col·lectiu Avinsilona.
 País Valencià, poble a poble, comarca a comarca, de Paco González Ramírez, d'on se n'ha tret informació amb el seu consentiment.
 Institut Valencià d'Estadística.
 Portal de la Direcció General d'Administració Local de la Generalitat.

Municipalities in the Province of Castellón
Ports (comarca)